Mircea Nicolaescu (born 1909) was a Romanian footballer who played as a striker.

International career
Mircea Nicolaescu played one friendly game for Romania, a 3–0 home victory against Bulgaria.

Honours
Venus Bucureşti
Divizia A: 1928–29, 1931–32

Notes

References

1909 births
Romanian footballers
Romania international footballers
Association football forwards
Liga I players
Venus București players
Footballers from Bucharest
Year of death missing